Caulibugula is a genus of bryozoans belonging to the family Bugulidae.

The genus has almost cosmopolitan distribution.

Species:

Caulibugula annulata 
Caulibugula arcasounensis 
Caulibugula armata 
Caulibugula aspinosa 
Caulibugula binata 
Caulibugula bocki 
Caulibugula caliculata 
Caulibugula californica 
Caulibugula ciliata 
Caulibugula ciliatoidea 
Caulibugula dendrograpta 
Caulibugula exilis 
Caulibugula glabra 
Caulibugula gracilenta 
Caulibugula haddoni 
Caulibugula hainanica 
Caulibugula hastingsae 
Caulibugula inermis 
Caulibugula irregularis 
Caulibugula levinseni 
Caulibugula longiconica 
Caulibugula longirostrata 
Caulibugula lunga 
Caulibugula mortenseni 
Caulibugula occidentalis 
Caulibugula pearsei 
Caulibugula separata 
Caulibugula sinica 
Caulibugula tuberosa 
Caulibugula zanzibariensis

References

Bryozoan genera